Sahara Legislative Assembly constituency is one of the 200 Legislative Assembly constituencies of Rajasthan state in India.

It is part of Bhilwara district.

Members of the Legislative Assembly

Election results

2021 by election 
A bye-election was needed due to the death of the sitting MLA, Kailash Chandra Trivedi, in October 2020.

2018

2013

See also
 List of constituencies of the Rajasthan Legislative Assembly
 Bhilwara district

References

Bhilwara district
Assembly constituencies of Rajasthan